Christoph Letkowski (born 16 June 1982) is a German actor. He appeared in more than forty films since 2006.

Selected filmography

References

External links 

1982 births
Living people
German male film actors
People from Halle (Saale)